Rayman is a side-scrolling platform video game developed and published by Ubisoft as the first installment of the Rayman series. It was originally released in September 1995 for MS-DOS, Windows, Atari Jaguar, Sega Saturn, and Sony PlayStation. The player controls Rayman, a hero who must restore balance to his colourful world from the evil Mr. Dark.

The game has appeared in various other formats, including versions for the Game Boy Advance, PlayStation Network, DSiWare, and iOS and Android devices. The mobile versions of Rayman were removed from digital stores in July 2018. On 29 October 2018, Sony revealed that the game would be one of 20 games pre-loaded on the PlayStation Classic, which was released on 3 December 2018. 3DO Interactive Multiplayer, Sega 32X, and Super Nintendo Entertainment System versions were planned but were cancelled.

Gameplay 

Rayman is a side-scrolling platform game. The player character is the titular Rayman, who must travel through six worlds (The Dream Forest, Band Land, Blue Mountains, Picture City, The Caves of Skops and Candy Château) to free all of the caged Electoons, six cages of whom are located somewhere on each level. Only when all the Electoons are freed will Rayman be able to reach and confront Mr Dark at his lair in Candy Château. Each level is divided into several maps, each of which is completed when Rayman reaches the "!" sign at the end. The player is given a certain number of lives, which are lost when Rayman takes too many hits or falls into water or a pit. If the player loses his last life, the "Game Over" screen will appear, and the player can continue or quit. Scattered around each level are small, sparkling blue spheres called Tings. The player gains an extra life for every 100 Tings picked up (50 in the DSi version). If the player loses a life, any Tings collected are lost. Tings can also be used to pay the Magician, a character found in certain levels, to enter a bonus stage, where Rayman can win an extra life. Rayman's "telescopic fist", an ability gained early in the game, allows him to punch enemies from a distance; most enemies can be defeated with a certain number of punches. At the end of each world, Rayman must defeat a boss enemy. The player comes across a variety of other power-ups and bonuses, such as a golden fist (which increases punch strength), a speed fist (which increases the speed of Rayman's punches), a power to restore Rayman's lost life energy, and flying blue elves whose touch shrinks Rayman down in size so he may access new areas.

In early stages of the game, Rayman has the ability to walk, crawl and make silly faces. He obtains additional powers during the game (telescopic punching, holding onto ledges, grappling flying rings, using his hair as helicopter blades to glide, and running) from Betilla the Fairy, while others are given temporarily from his friends that are used for a specific levels only.

Plot 
In the planet in which Rayman lives, people are harmonious thanks to the Great Protoon. However, the evil Mr. Dark steals the Protoon, causing the Electoons, tiny beings that maintain harmony on Rayman's planet, to scatter all over the world. Betilla the Fairy, a guardian of the Great Protoon, battles Mr. Dark to get back the Protoon and Electoons, but fails, so Rayman decides to go and find the Electoons, free the Great Protoon and defeat Mr. Dark. Betilla the Fairy frequently interacts with Rayman as needed to give him additional magical powers along his journey.
 
As he searches the world for the Electoons, Rayman confronts strange enemies and is aided by new friends, and learns that Mr. Dark has kidnapped Betilla and imprisoned her in one of the little spheres attached to his hat.

After he rescues all of the Electoons, Rayman faces Mr. Dark, who attacks with various disorienting spells. Rayman arrives in a hall, where Mr. Dark traps him with walls of fire. At the last moment, Electoons retrieve Rayman's ability to punch after Mr. Dark disables it, with this latter continuing the fight by transforming himself into hybrids of the bosses previously fought by Rayman. Upon the defeat of Mr. Dark, Rayman rescues Betilla and recovers the Great Protoon, thus restoring balance to his world. Rayman then takes a vacation with friends and former enemies.

Development 

Rayman was created by French video game designer Michel Ancel, with additional contributions to the character's final design by programmer Frédéric Houde and artist Alexandra Steible. Ancel had produced the first designs of Rayman in the 1980s when he was a teenager, at a time when he was learning to draw, compose music, and code in order to follow his dream of making video games. When work formally began on Rayman, Ancel revisited his initial drawings and developed the game's world and its characters, citing Celtic, Chinese, and Russian fairy tales as a major source of inspiration. He was also inspired by his childhood, having spent a lot of time by rivers and "chasing strange insects, climbing big trees". When Ancel started work on the game, he began with trees and "strange creatures". In the early 1990s, Ancel became interested in the computer graphic technique of ray tracing and incorporated it into the character animations he was designing at the time. This resulted in the designs of Rayman himself, with his name alluding to the aforementioned technique. Ancel originally envisioned the game's story to involve Jimmy, a human boy who creates an imaginary online world named Hereitscool. After it becomes infected with a computer virus, Jimmy travels into the world and inhabits the body of Rayman, his in-game avatar, to defeat the virus. The idea was scrapped during later development.

By 1988, French video game publisher Ubisoft, founded two years earlier by the five sons of the Guillemot family, had hired around six developers and operated from Montreuil, a western suburb of Paris. Ancel was one of Ubisoft's early hires, having caught the attention of the Guillemot brothers for his animation skills. Yves Guillemot encouraged Ancel to pitch ideas for new games, which led to a meeting between Ancel, Houde, designer Serge Hascoët, and Gérard, Yves, and Michael Guillemot, after Ancel and Houde had teamed up and worked on the Rayman concept further. Hascoet recalled the pair presenting a "totally strange" design of a "giant trombone and you had to imagine the player inside", and an animation system that Ancel had developed for roughly six months which he praised for its fluidity. Despite being in the research and development stage, Hascoet pushed for the game to enter formal production and Michel Guillemot agreed to take it on. After Rayman received the green-light in 1992, Ancel said "everything changed". Michel Guillemot realised that additional staff was needed to see the game through, and organised the company accordingly. He also inject money into the project, with Ubisoft setting aside a budget of 15 million francs. Development then split into two offices, with more automated tasks done in Paris and the artistic work completed by Ancel, Houde, and their team of designers at their own facility outside Montpellier. Founded in 1994 as Ubi Pictures, the studio became Ubisoft Montpellier.

Ancel initially produced Rayman for the Atari ST, a 16-bit personal computer system, working alone on every aspect of the game. Following Houde's arrival on the project, Ancel noticed that public interest in the ST had started to wane and looked to the Super NES CD-ROM, a CD peripheral for the 16-bit Super Nintendo Entertainment System (SNES). However, in 1993 Nintendo abandoned the project before the hardware was produced. Ancel and Houde ruled out a release for the cartridge-based SNES, doubting its ability to handle the large amount of information they wanted to incorporate into the game. The pair switched focus towards newer and more powerful consoles, leaving the SNES version of the game unfinished. This led to the decision to produce Rayman for the Atari Jaguar, a 64-bit cartridge-based system that the team felt could handle the graphics they wanted. In late 1994, magazine advertisements announced the game as a Jaguar exclusive title. Between 1993 and 1994, Rayman originally was submitted to Apogee Software by Ancel, however the publisher was scrapped.

Ubisoft decided to also make Rayman a launch title for the North American and European release of the upcoming Sony PlayStation, a CD-based console. Yves Guillemot said the PlayStation edition of Rayman was a way of "beat[ing] Japan on platforming games" by releasing it simultaneously with a new and powerful system. Ancel recalled the number of developers working on the game began to increase, from Houde and himself at its conception, to 100. Later in development, a version for the Sega Saturn was produced. Versions for the 32X (an add-on for the Sega Genesis) and 3DO systems were also announced, but never released.

In 1997, an expansion pack entitled Rayman Designer was released for Microsoft Windows, containing a level editor and 24 new levels. A second expansion, Rayman par ses Fans ("Rayman by His Fans"), was released in 1998 and includes 40 fan-created levels chosen by Ubisoft for official release. In July 2017, after an early build of the SNES prototype that had been considered lost was rediscovered, it was released online by developer and programmer Omar Cornut with Ancel's permission.

Release 
By the end of 1995, 400,000 copies of the game had been sold in Europe. This number grew to 900,000 copies sold worldwide after two years. It is also the best-selling PlayStation game of all time in the UK, beating popular titles such as Tomb Raider II and Gran Turismo. According to Gamasutra, Rayman Advances sales neared 600,000 units during the first half of the 2001–2002 fiscal year alone. The game's sales reached 770,000 copies by the end of March 2002.

UbiSoft published a dedicated website for Rayman, where visitors could download a playable demo of the game. The website also contained a hints page if players had difficulty in completing levels.

Reception 

Rayman has been highly acclaimed for its animated 2D graphics, atmosphere, and soundtrack. It was awarded both "Best Music in a CD-ROM Game" and "Best Animation" in Electronic Gaming Monthly's 1995 Video Game Awards.

Electronic Gaming Monthly gave the PlayStation version a score of 8.625 out of 10 and their "Game of the Month" award. They highly praised the originality, animation, and musical score, and remarked that it firmly disproved the rumor that the PlayStation cannot do side-scrolling games well. GamePro likewise praised the animation and music, as well as Rayman's many acquired abilities, and commented that "Rayman is a dazzling delight and ranks as one of the most visually appealing games of this or any year." A critic for Next Generation, though noting a lack of original gameplay elements, agreed Rayman to be an exceptional game, praising its clever design, depth, graphics, and sound. Entertainment Weekly gave the game an A+.

Electronic Gaming Monthly gave the Jaguar version an 8 out of 10, assessing that it is an outstanding platformer on its own terms but pales against the PlayStation version due to the lower sound quality of the music and most especially the slow responsiveness of the controls. GamePro also rated it slightly less than the PlayStation version. However, both magazines noted it as one of the best Jaguar games to date, with GamePro remarking "Finally, a game that shows off the Jaguar's capabilities." A critic for Next Generation found the Jaguar version impeccable, venturing that "there is little about the PlayStation or Saturn versions that will top this one."

Sam Hickman of Sega Saturn Magazine gave the Saturn version a 78%, remarking that "if you were just watching somebody else playing the game you could be easily fooled into thinking this was the best thing to appear on the Saturn for quite some time. However, in reality, it's a bit too dull a bit too often, and at times, it's just plain irritating and damned difficult." Japanese reviewers judged the Saturn version similarly, with the game receiving a score a 29 out of 40 by a panel of four reviewers at Famicom Tsūshin. GamePro, however, called it "just what gamers are looking for on the Saturn", and compared it favorably to previous Saturn "hop-n-boppers" Bug! and Astal. They noted that while the graphics and music sometimes seem kiddie-oriented, the challenge is oriented to veteran gamers. They also highly praised the lush visuals and made particular note of the Saturn version's between-level effects.

GameSpot gave the MS-DOS version a 7.4, complaining of several issues such as the infrequent save points, but summarizing, "Take any good scroller like Donkey Kong or Pitfall, add scintillating colors, wonderfully clever gaming elements, engaging and humorous characters, terrific music, and heaps of whimsy and you have Rayman." They did, however, criticize the fact that one had to install a "ridiculous" 50 MB of data on their drive just to see the introductory animation, with the whole installation being a "sublime" 94 MB. Next Generations review praised the graphics, solid game speed even on low-end PCs, "multitude of challenges", and charming player character, and said the game made a good change of pace from other PC releases.

Next Generation reviewed the Game Boy Advance version of the game, rating it four stars out of five, and stated that "The familiar-yet-solid gameplay remains the same, with Rayman running, jumping, climbing, and punching his way through level after level of lush, colorful environments ranging from a jungle and a moonscape to a musically-themed wonderland. The sound and controls are solid, and the game's peculiar personality remains intact."

References 

Sources

External links 

Rayman at MobyGames

1995 video games
Android (operating system) games
Atari Jaguar games
Cancelled 3DO Interactive Multiplayer games
Cancelled Sega 32X games
Cancelled Super Nintendo Entertainment System games
DOS games
DSiWare games
Game Boy Advance games
Game Boy Color games
Games commercially released with DOSBox
IOS games
Side-scrolling platform games
PlayStation (console) games
PlayStation Network games
 
Sega Saturn games
Single-player video games
Ubisoft games
Video games about dreams
Video games about size change
Video games developed in France
Video games developed in Italy
Video games with expansion packs
Virtual Console games
Windows games
Windows Mobile Professional games
Digital Eclipse games